The 1909–10 Kansas Jayhawks men's basketball team represented the University of Kansas in its twelfth season of collegiate basketball, and its third in the Missouri Valley Intercollegiate Athletic Association, or MVIAA. The team would go on to win its third MVIAA Conference Championship. The head coach was W. O. Hamilton, serving in his first year in that capacity for Kansas. On January 15, the Jayhawks reached their first major milestone victory in reaching its 100th win. The Jayhawks finished the season 18–1.

Roster
Robert Heizer
Thomas Johnson
Harold Larson
Verne Long
Donald Martindell
Verni Smith
Edward Van der Vries
Raymond Watson
Earl Woodward

Schedule

References

Kansas Jayhawks men's basketball seasons
Kansas
Kansas
Kansas